Papilio thaiwanus, the Formosan swallowtail, is a butterfly in the swallowtail family. It is endemic to Taiwan.

The larva feeds on Toddalia asiatica, Zanthoxylum ailanthoides, and Cinnamomum camphora.

References

thaiwanus
Lepidoptera of Taiwan
Endemic fauna of Taiwan
Butterflies described in 1898
Taxa named by Walter Rothschild